Manithaneya Makkal Katchi is a political party in Tamil Nadu, India. Its president is M. H. Jawahirullah.

In 2009 election Manithaneya makkal Katchi contested in railway engine symbol.2011 Tamil Nadu Legislative Assembly election, the party joined the All India Anna Dravida Munnetra Kazhagam alliance and was allocated three seats to contest in  Candle Symbol .Jawahirullah won in Ramanathapuram and A. Aslam Basha did so in Ambur.

2016 Assembly elections and 2021 election
For the 2016 Tamil Nadu Legislative Assembly election the party joined with the Dravida Munnetra Kazhagam(DMK) alliance and was allocated four constituencies to contest.And Contested in Cup and Saucer Symbol in Four Constituency.In 2021 election Manithaneya makkal Katchi again joined with DPA alliance And Dmk allotted 2 seats Papanasam and Manapparai, In Papanasam the Manithaneya makkal Katchi leader Jawahirullah contested in Scissor Symbol And in Manapparai Manithaneya makkal Katchi's Candidate Abdul Samadhu contested in Dmk's Raising Sun Symbol.

See also
Tamil Nadu Muslim Munnetra Kazagham

References

Sources
Tamil Nadu: The Rise of Islamist Fundamentalism, by P.G. Rajamohan, South Asia Terrorism Portal
 Staff reporters (25 September 2007). "Lift ban on SIMI: TMMK". The Hindu.

External links
 

Political parties in Tamil Nadu
Political parties established in 2009
2009 establishments in Tamil Nadu